The Cartier Champion Sprinter is an award in European horse racing, founded in 1991, and sponsored by Cartier SA as part of the Cartier Racing Awards. The award winner is decided by points earned in group races plus the votes cast by British racing journalists and readers of the Racing Post and The Daily Telegraph newspapers.

Records
Most successful horse (2 wins):
 Lochsong – 1993, 1994

Leading sires (3 winners each):
 Green Desert – Sheikh Albadou (1991), Tamarisk (1998), Oasis Dream (2003) 
 Dark Angel – Lethal Force (2013), Harry Angel (2017), Battaash (2020) 

Leading trainer (3 wins):
 Aidan O'Brien – Stravinsky (1999), Mozart (2001), Starspangledbanner (2010)

Leading owner (3 wins):
 Sue Magnier – Stravinsky (1999), Mozart (2001), Starspangledbanner (2010)

Winners

References

Horse racing awards